Pempelia brephiella is a moth of the family Pyralidae. It is found in Southwestern Europe.

References

Moths described in 1880
Phycitini
Moths of Europe
Moths of Asia